HappyOrNot Ltd. is a Finnish instant feedback company that makes terminals for measuring customer satisfaction. The company has invented Smiley Terminals and by September 2020 it had sold them in 135 countries. The terminals consist of four smiley-faced buttons that customers are invited to press to indicate whether they are very happy, happy, unhappy or very unhappy with the service they were provided. This information is used by companies to find points where they are providing suboptimal service and to improve it.

By June 2019 there were 30,000 terminals in use and over one billion button pushes had been recorded.

History

2009-2016

The company was founded by Heikki Väänänen and Ville Levaniemi. Väänänen had come up with the idea of giving customers an easy way to provide anonymous feedback and introduced this idea to his former colleague, Ville Levaniemi  and they started the company in 2009  with the money they got from the sale of their first company, Universomo. They ordered the first terminals from a Finnish manufacturer. The company's first big customer was one of Finland's top-three supermarket groups who was curious to gauge the freshness of their vegetables and fruits. Shortly thereafter, also Heathrow Airport in London and French Carrefour started using their service. Heathrow drew international attention to the company.

In 2014 HappyOrNot established a Board of Directors and established the company’s Florida’s headquarters.

In 2016, the company's turnover was EUR 4.4 million, of which exports accounted for over 90%. It had employees in the UK, Germany, Singapore, Finland and the United States.

2017–
By October 2017, there were 11 different nationalities among 65 employees. At this time, the company had about 4,000 customers in 100 countries deploying 25,000 terminals. Concurrently, the company received an investment of EUR 14.5 million from two international venture capitalists, Northzone, (first back of Spotify), and Nordicand AirTree Ventures from Australia which boosted growth at home and in the United States, Britain and Germany. This type of investment was exceptionally high for a Finnish startup. With the investment, Northzone’s Marta Sjögren began advising the founders in scaling the company. Marketing was focused on quality and concentrated in the company’s best markets, particularly in the United States. The company’s global reseller network topped over 100 companies.

The year 2018, saw growth to 160 employees and a turnover of 7.7 million euros. A 4-page story in the New Yorker Magazine in February 2018, spiked awareness with customers, investors and job seekers as well as media interest from the BBC and NBC. Väänänen also became a content producer for Forbes.

In 2019 there were HappyOrNot terminals in 130 countries and over one billion button pushes had been recorded.

In 2020 the company added an anti-microbial coating to its terminals to reduce the spread of coronavirus. It also tested QR codes the customers were able to print but they required more time from the respondents. After that HappyOrNot started to study if motion sensor cameras could make the smiley consoles touchless.

The products

The idea behind HappyOrNot’s products and services is that people are often too busy to provide feedback while selecting a sentiment from one of four smileys is fast. Everyone can participate and provide feedback, there are no barriers due to age, culture or language. Additionally, those providing feedback do so anonymously without risk of identity theft thus companies are not required to reference GDPR requirements.

While the devices are used the collect the feedback; HappyOrNot analytical reporting assists clients with interpretation of the data. For example, a retail chain noted that their sales were stronger in the afternoon and was looking for the reason why mornings were not as good. Analytics revealed them that customers in the afternoon were in fact less satisfied with their service so if the amount of sales staff would be increased, sales would probably increase as well.

In addition to terminals, the company offers also digital queries that work on smartphones and webpages.

The data that is collected with the Smileys is analyzed and used by companies to guide customer service and customer experience improvements. The service can also be used to monitor and measure employee sentiment. By setting their own targets and collecting continuous feedback, companies can react immediately to situations that are occurring in the workplace.

Customers
The company has thousands of customers in locations such as airports, shops and hospitals. A sample of customers include: Levi’s Stadium, home to the San Francisco 49ers, Biltema, Carrefour, City of Helsinki, Ikea, Vianor, Walmart, United States Border Guard and Zara. Also Heathrow and Southend airports use HappyOrNot terminals.

Among the companies that have used company's service to measure employee satisfaction are Gigantti, Nordea, Microsoft, DHL, LinkedIn and eBAy.

Awards and recognition
In 2015 HappyOrNot won National Champion at the European Business Awards (EBA) and was ranked as one of the fastest-growing companies in Finland by Kauppalehti, number four in the Deloitte Technology Fast 50 in Finland. Ernst & Young named Heikki Väänänen, the CEO, Young Entrepreneur of the Year.
In 2017, the company was ranked 212th on the FT1000 Europe's Fastest Growing Companies list maintained by the Financial Times and the Board of Directors received “The Golden Mallet” for their good work in 2017 from Hallituspartnerit.
In 2018, HappyOrNot was chosen as one of WIRED’s Hottest Startups in Finland.

References

External links

Service companies of Finland
Customer experience
Finnish companies established in 2009
Companies based in Tampere